Kawasaki made the KDX125 starting in 1990 with model A1 and ending in 1999 with model b6, The KDX125 was a road going version of the KX125 and was known as the enduro version of the KMX125. The full power model or derestricted version was capable of 80-85 mph and power increase from 12 - 24bhp.This model was the 'B' version for anyone with a full bike licence. The 'A' model could be derestricted by cutting the washer from the downpipe or buying an after market down pipe. Other modifications like racing Reed's, altering the KIPS (powervalve) system and after marker silencer would all add to a greater top speed.

References

KDX125
Two-stroke motorcycles
Motorcycles introduced in 1999